Fritz Adam Hermann von Opel (4 May 1899 – 8 April 1971) was a German rocket technology pioneer and automotive executive, nicknamed "Rocket-Fritz". He is remembered mostly for his spectacular demonstrations of rocket propulsion that earned him an important place in the history of aviation and spaceflight as head of the world's first large-scale rocket program, Opel-RAK. Fritz von Opel, known as Fritz Adam Hermann Opel until his father was ennobled in 1917, was the only son of Wilhelm von Opel and a grandson of Adam Opel, founder of the Opel company.

Life and career
Opel was born in Rüsselsheim. He studied at the Technische Universität Darmstadt and received his doctorate from the university. After graduation, he was made director of testing for the Opel company and also put in charge of publicity. 

Fritz von Opel was a grandson of Adam Opel and son of Wilhelm von Opel. His sister was Elinor von Opel, a cousin Georg von Opel. When his father Wilhelm was raised to hereditary nobility in 1917, his descendants were also ennobled. In 1929 he married his first wife Margot Löwenstein (also known as Sellnik), an actress and one of Germany's first female aviators, and after the divorce eventually his second wife in 1947, Emita Herrán Olozaga, daughter of the diplomat Rafael Bernando Herrán Echeverri and his wife Lucia Olozaga. This marriage resulted in two children, Frederick von Opel, called Rikky (* 1947), and Marie Christine von Opel, called Putzi (1951-2006).

Until 1928 he was a partner in the Adam Opel company, until then a family limited partnership. In Dec. 1928, the company was converted into a stock corporation, but already in March 1929, 80% of the shares were sold to General Motors Corporation of the US. The Opel heirs received 120 million Reichsmarks in return. A few years later, Adam Opel AG was completely owned by General Motors. Fritz von Opel invested part of his large fortune in the USA, where it was confiscated during the war.

Von Opel was highly successful in different kinds of motorsports, inter alia he won the inaugural race on Berlin's AVUS race track on 24 September 1921 on an Opel 8/25 hp racing car with a 2.3 litre four-cylinder engine, with an average speed 128.84 km/h and also was setting the lap record of the first racing weekend with 8 min 14 s. Two years later, on 24 June 1923 he won at the AVUS track on a Opel 346 cc motorbike the race organized by the German Motorcyclists' Association DMV with an average speed of 87 km/h. Fritz von Opel was also active in motorboat racing where he e.g. dominated with his "Opel II", equipped with two Maybach Mb IVa engines of each 260 hp, the July 1927 series of events on the Seine in Paris. He was winning the "Coupe de France", the "Prize of the French Naval Minister" and finally the "Trophée de Paris". In Germany he continued his winning spree in 1927 with the "Blue Band of the Rhine", the ADAC regatta on Lake Starnberg and was eventually crowned German Champion at the ADAC Motorboat Championship on Templiner See.

Fritz von Opel was instrumental in popularizing rockets as means of propulsion for vehicles. In the 1920s, he initiated together with Max Valier, co-founder of the "Verein für Raumschiffahrt", and Friedrich Wilhelm Sander the world's first rocket program, Opel-RAK, leading to speed records for automobiles, rail vehicles and the first public manned rocket-powered flight in September 1929. Months earlier in 1928, one of his rocket-powered prototypes, the Opel RAK2, reached piloted by von Opel himself at the AVUS speedway in Berlin a record speed of 238 km/h, watched by 3000 spectators and world media, among them Fritz Lang, director of Metropolis and Woman in the Moon, world boxing champion Max Schmeling and many more sports and show business celebrities. A world record for rail vehicles was reached with RAK3 and a top speed of 256 km/h. After these successes, von Opel piloted the world's first public rocket-powered flight using Opel RAK.1, a rocket plane designed by Julius Hatry.

Fritz von Opel ignited two 40-centimeter-long, 6.5-kilogram rockets at Frankfurt-Rebstock Airport, accelerating the aircraft to a good 100 kilometers per hour. On 30 September 1929, at exactly 3:30 p.m., the plane took off. Two more propellants provided additional thrust totaling 96 kilograms, enabling the plane to climb. At an altitude of 20 to 30 meters, the aircraft reached a top speed of 150 km/h and covered a distance of just under two kilometers. When attempting to ignite further rockets, the mechanism failed - Fritz von Opel had a hard landing on the ground after 80 seconds in the air, but remained unharmed. For the first time, a pilot had succeeded before a large audience in taking off using only rocket power and transitioning to a climb followed by a cross-country flight. World media reported on these efforts inter alia as "The first human rocket", including Universal Newsreel of the US, causing as "Raketen-Rummel" or "Rocket Rumble" immense global public excitement, and in particular in Germany, where inter alia Wernher von Braun was highly influenced: 16-year old Wernher was so enthusiastic about the public Opel RAK demonstrations, that he constructed his own homemade rocket car, nearly killing himself in the process, and causing a major disruption in a crowded street by detonating the toy wagon to which he had attached fireworks. He was taken into custody by the local police until his father came to get him released.

Timeline

 On 15 March 1928, Opel tested his first rocket-powered car, the Opel RAK.1, and achieved a top speed of 75 km/h (47 mph) in it, proving the feasibility of the concept of rocket propulsion. Less than two months later, he reached a speed of 230 km/h (143 mph) in the RAK.2, driven by 24 solid-fuel rockets.
 Later that same year, he purchased a sailplane named the "Lippisch Ente" (Ente is "duck" in German) from Alexander Lippisch and attached rocket motors to it, creating the world's first rocket plane on 11 June. The aircraft exploded on its second test flight, before Opel had had a chance to pilot it himself, so he commissioned a new aircraft, also called the RAK.1, from Julius Hatry, and flew it at Frankfurt-am-Main on 30 September 1929. In the meantime, another mishap had claimed the RAK.3, a rocket-powered railway car powered by 30 solid-fuel rockets which had reached a speed of 254 km/h (157 mph). 
 Also in 1928, Opel built and test ran a rocket-powered motorcycle called the Monster.

Liquid-fuel rocket development, test launches and break-up of Opel RAK 

Opel and Sander also worked on the design of a liquid-fuel rocket engine. This put them in competition with research groups led by Professor Hermann Oberth, Wernher von Braun, Johannes Winkler and Arthur Rudolph, who eventually became known as key rocket pioneers. As early as April 1929, they tested two rockets in which a "reaction engine" powered by liquid fuels provides enormous thrust. The result was a rocket engine that developed a continuous thrust of around 300 kilograms over a burn time of according to Sander nearly 45 minutes. The pioneers eventually transplanted an engine of this type into a light aircraft. However, Fritz von Opel's originally planned flight across the English Channel never took place: The Opel rocket tests ended in the fall of 1929. Fritz von Opel had to discontinue his work because the Great Depression was taking its toll on the one hand and the new majority owner General Motors wanted to concentrate on the automotive business on the other. The future of the industry in Germany had appeared uncertain, and competition from imports of automobiles from the USA had increased. Fritz von Opel and other family members had rejected a larger merger of German automobile companies, which the Association of the German Automobile Industry (RdA), Deutsche Bank and DANAT-Bank proposed in 1927/28. In October 1928 a purchase option was negotiated with GM. A stock corporation, registered on 3 December 1928 was founded as "Adam Opel AG " with a share capital of 60 million Reichsmark. In March 1929 the contracts were signed by Fritz von Opel, his father Wilhelm and his uncle Fritz on the part of the Opel family, the name "Opel" was retained. GM initially took over 80% of the shares representing a nominal value of 48 million Reichsmarks, and GM acquired the remaining 20% in October 1931.

Life after Opel RAK break-up 
After the end of the Opel-RAK collaboration with Opel and Sander, Max Valier continued the efforts. Also switching from solid-fuel to liquid-fuel rockets, he died while testing and is considered the first fatality of the dawning space age. The impact of Opel RAK was both immediate and long-lasting on later spaceflight pioneers. Opel, Sander, Valier and Hatry had engaged in a program that led directly to use of jet-assisted takeoff for heavily laden aircraft. The German Reich was first to test the approach in August 1929 when a battery of solid rocket propellants supported a Junkers Ju-33 seaplane to get airborne. The Opel RAK experiments had a tremendous influence on Lippisch, whose experience with the rocket-powered "Ente" eventually paved the way to the Messerschmitt Me-163, the first operational rocket fighter craft. The Opel RAK experiments excited also the interest of the German military, which provided funding for further development of rockets as a replacement for artillery. This led to an array of military applications, among them Germany's V-2 terror weapon, the world's first ballistic missile. After World War II, these German rocket and missile scientists and engineers would have an immense impact on missile and space programs by the United States of America. Walter J. Boyne, director of the National Air and Space Museum in Washington, DC, concluded "Working together, von Opel, Valier, and Sander had thrown a big rock of publicity into the mill pond of science. The ripples have not yet ceased to spread."

Von Opel left Germany before 1930, first to the US and eventually to France and Switzerland where he died. He was present at the Secret Meeting of 20 February 1933 when German industrialists decided to support Adolf Hitler, but did not contribute personally to the donations. His sister Elinor von Opel had to flee Germany in 1935 with her sons, Ernst Wilhelm Sachs von Opel and Gunter Sachs von Opel, due a legal battle on her divorce and because of her public aversion to Nazi leadership, friends of her former husband Willy Sachs. Elinor's German assets were blocked and confiscated by the German Reich government.

On 25 April 1940, Fritz von Opel was taken off the Italian liner Conte di Savoia by the British authorities at Gibraltar. After being detained at Gibraltar for 16 days, he was allowed to proceed to the United States, arriving in May on the Italian liner Rex. He was arrested by the Federal Bureau of Investigation in February 1942, as a "potentially dangerous alien", although he was subsequently released.

In 1947, Opel married Emita Herrán Olózaga (1913–1967) and became the father of Formula One driver Rikky von Opel (Frederick von Opel), who was born later the same year.

He died at Samedan in Switzerland in 1971.

Weltraumschiff I movie featuring Opel RAK pioneers 

The 1937 German film Weltraumschiff I startet –Eine technische Fantasie–, is a short movie made by Anton Kutter in 1937 about the fictitious launch of a space rocket that lands back on earth after orbiting the moon in an Apollo-8-style mission: In front of representatives of the press, the director of the Friedrichshafen airship yard announced the first manned rocket flight to the moon. In an introduction he describes the history of rocket technology and the technical details of space travel. Immediately before take-off, reporters interviewed the commander of the spaceship via video radio, which then flies over a kilometer-long ski jump into space and returns safely to earth after orbiting the moon.

The movie features impressive visual effects and has short clips of various RAK vehicles: 11 seconds at 436 feet (approximately 04:47) igniters being wired to the Rak.2 car; 2 seconds at 447 feet (approximately 04:58) Max Valier seated in a RAK.2 car labeled "Rückstoss Versuchs Wagen"; 2 seconds at 451 feet (approximately 05:00) Fritz von Opel seated in a RAK.2 car; 11 seconds at 460 feet (approximately 05:06) Fritz Von Opel drives the RAK.2 car on 1928 May 23 at the Avus Track in Berlin; 2 seconds at 472 feet (05:14) Opel RAK.3 rocket car on 1928 June 23 running on railway tracks; 19 seconds at 475 feet (05:16 to 05:35) Opel RAK.1 rocket glider in 1928 September, preparation and launch; 6 seconds at 536 feet (05:57 to 06:03) Max Valier sitting and talking in a RAK.6 car.

References

1899 births
1971 deaths
People from Rüsselsheim
Engineers from Hesse
People from the Grand Duchy of Hesse
Fritz
German automotive pioneers
German spaceflight pioneers
Technische Universität Darmstadt alumni